Alan Robert Hargesheimer (born November 21, 1954) is a former Major League Baseball pitcher. Since his retirement, Hargesheimer has worked as a scout for several teams, including the Detroit Tigers, Colorado Rockies and San Diego Padres.

Signed by the San Francisco Giants in 1978 as an amateur free agent, Hargesheimer made an impressive Major League debut on July 14, 1980. He was the starting and winning pitcher in a 5-3 victory over the host Cincinnati Reds at Riverfront Stadium, supported by a first-inning Jack Clark home run and by his own run-scoring double in the fourth.

Hargesheimer would have a 4-6 record that season for the Giants, but would get only one MLB victory thereafter. Was traded to the Chicago Cubs in 1983 and appeared in 5 games as a reliever. After his trade to the Kansas City Royals in 1984, injuries limited him to only 5 games in 1986 after which he retired in December of 1988 to pursue a scouting career.

He is a graduate of both Senn High School in Chicago in 1972 and Northeastern Illinois University in 1977.

References

External links
, or Retrosheet, or Pelota Binaria (Venezuelan Winter League)

1954 births
Living people
Baseball players from Chicago
Cardenales de Lara players
American expatriate baseball players in Venezuela
Chicago Cubs players
Colorado Rockies scouts
Detroit Tigers scouts
Fresno Giants players
Iowa Cubs players
Kansas City Royals players
Major League Baseball pitchers
Northeastern Illinois Golden Eagles baseball players
Omaha Royals players
Phoenix Giants players
San Francisco Giants players
San Diego Padres scouts
Shreveport Captains players
Texas Rangers scouts